The MTV Europe Music Award for Best Album was first awarded in 1998, before being retired in 2008. Nelly Furtado's 2006 album Loose was the only album that was nominated twice.

Winners and nominees
Winners are listed first and highlighted in bold.

1990s

2000s

References

MTV Europe Music Awards
Awards established in 1998
Album awards
Awards disestablished in 2008